Patrick Verne "Putter" Smith (born January 19, 1941) is an American jazz bassist, music teacher, author, and actor.

Early life
Smith was born in Bell, California, and began playing the bass at the age of eight, inspired by his older brother, jazz musician Carson Smith. He made his performing debut aged 13 at the Compton Community Center.

Career
He went on to perform with Thelonious Monk, Art Blakey, Duke Ellington, Billy Eckstine, Diane Schuur, Lee Konitz, Bruce Forman, Jackie and Roy, Carmen McRae, Gary Foster, Art Farmer, Blue Mitchell, Erroll Garner, Gerry Mulligan, Art Pepper, Alan Broadbent, Bob Brookmeyer, Warne Marsh, Ray Charles, Patrice Rushen, Michael Kanan, Jorge Rossy, Jimmy Wormworth, Mason Williams, Percy Faith, Burt Bacharach, The Manhattan Transfer, and Johnny Mathis. He also works as a session musician, and has played on recordings by Beck, Smokey Hormel,  Sonny and Cher, The Beach Boys, and The Righteous Brothers, among many others.

Smith has also taught at the Musician's Institute, and at the California Institute of the Arts.

Smith was playing with Monk at the Los Angeles jazz club Shelly's Manne-Hole when he was spotted by director Guy Hamilton, who cast him as the assassin "Mr. Kidd" (alongside Bruce Glover as "Mr. Wint") in the 1971 James Bond film Diamonds Are Forever. He went on to have several other minor acting roles on film and television.

Filmography 
Diamonds Are Forever (1971) – Mr. Kidd
Win, Place or Steal (1974) – Kangaroo
In the Mood (1987) – Minister

References

External links 

 
 
 
 Putter Smith puttersmithmusic.com

1941 births
Living people
People from Bell, California
20th-century American male actors
Male actors from California
American jazz double-bassists
Male double-bassists
American male film actors
Jazz musicians from California
21st-century double-bassists
21st-century American male musicians
American male jazz musicians